Events in the year 2013 in Slovenia.

Incumbents
President: Borut Pahor
Prime Minister: Janez Janša (until 20 March); Alenka Bratušek (from 20 March)

Events
Ongoing: 2012–2013 Slovenian protests

Sport
 20–30 June – Slovenia at the 2013 Mediterranean Games
 1–7 July – The tennis tournament 2013 Tilia Slovenia Open
 4–22 September – Slovenia hosted the EuroBasket 2013
 Football: 2013 Slovenian Supercup
 2013–14 Slovenian Football Cup
 Football: 2013–14 Slovenian PrvaLiga
 2013–14 Slovenian Hockey League season
 2013–14 Slovenian Basketball League

Deaths

7 January – Maruša Krese, poet, writer and journalist (born 1947).
3 February – Matija Duh, motorcycle speedway rider (born 1989).
1 March – Janez Albreht, actor (born 1925).
28 March – Boris Strel, alpine skier (born 1959).
14 April – Stanko Topolčnik, judoka (born 1947). 
2 July – Roman Bengez, footballer (born 1964).
23 August – Vesna Rožič, chess player (born 1987).
25 August – Ciril Bergles, poet, essayist and translator (born 1934).
25 August – Rajko Pavlovec, geologist (born 1932)
19 September – Viktor Tišler, ice hockey player (born 1941). 
28 November – Mitja Ribičič, politician (born 1919)

References

 
2010s in Slovenia
Years of the 21st century in Slovenia
Slovenia
Slovenia